Here is the discography of American rock singer-songwriter and musician Jackson Browne.

Albums

Studio albums

Compilation and live albums

Singles

Guest singles

Other appearances

Studio appearances

Live appearances

Guest appearances

References

Discography
Rock music discographies
Discographies of American artists